Get to the Heart: The Barbara Mandrell Story is a made-for-television film about the life of country music star Barbara Mandrell.

Cast

Maureen McCormick as Barbara Mandrell
Dwight Schultz as Irby Mandrell
Greg Kean as Ken Dudney
Lisa Blount as Mary Mandrell
Portia Dawson as Thelma Louise Mandrell
Kenny Rogers as himself

References

External links
 

1997 television films
1997 films
American biographical films
American television films
Biographical films about musicians
Biographical television films
Country music films
Films directed by Jerry London
1990s American films